Barbara Brooks Wallace (December 3, 1922 – November 27, 2018) was an American children's writer.  She won the NLAPW Children's Book Award and International Youth Library "Best of the Best" for Claudia (2001) and William Allen White Children's Book Award for Peppermints in the Parlor (1983).

Early life
Wallace was born and spent her childhood in China, where she attended Shanghai American School, but came to live in the United States during high school. San Francisco was a port of entry for the family many times. She graduated from UCLA where she was a member of the Alpha Phi sorority.

Career
Wallace won Edgar Awards from the Mystery Writers of America for both The Twin in the Tavern (1994) and Sparrows in the Scullery (1998). Cousins in The Castle (1997) and Ghosts in the Gallery (2001) were also nominated for the Edgar Award.

Wallace's books are often compared to Lemony Snicket as well as books by Joan Lowery Nixon and Beverly Cleary. She has also received high praise from the American Library Association.

In 2009, Wallace tapped the creative development group Pangea Corporation to develop her series of books into animated and live action entertainment. Her Miss Switch series had previously enjoyed popular installments on ABC Weekend Special, garnering the high Nielsen ratings. Wallace's Hawkins books were also featured as live action films on ABC Weekend Special.

Wallace's novel Diary of a Little Devil was published as a digital eBook in September 2011. The deal was the result of Pangea's efforts and culminates with additional books to be released in the same manner, including a new installment to the Miss Switch series: Miss Switch and the Vile Villains.

Death
Wallace died November 27, 2018 in Arlington, Virginia from complications of pneumonia at the age of 95.

Books
Secret in St. Something
Peppermints in the Parlor
The Perils of Peppermints
The Barrel in the Basement
The Interesting Thing That Happened At Perfect Acres, Inc.
Hello Claudia!
Claudia and Duffy
Victoria
Can Do, Missy Charlie
The Secret Summer of L.E.B.
Andrew the Big Deal
Julia and the Third Bad Thing
Palmer Patch
The Hawkins Series
Miss Switch Online
Miss Switch to the Rescue
The Trouble with Miss Switch
Argyle
Ghosts in the Gallery
Cousins in the Castle
Miss Switch's Bathsheba & The Cat Caper (co-authored with John C. Besmehn)

References

External links

National League of American Pen Women, Inc. website 
International Youth Library website 
 (including 1 "from old catalog")

1922 births
2018 deaths
20th-century American novelists
21st-century American novelists
American children's writers
American mystery writers
Edgar Award winners
University of California, Los Angeles alumni
American women novelists
Women mystery writers
20th-century American women writers
21st-century American women writers